The Ottawa Chamberfest summer festival is a music festival held by Ottawa Chamberfest, also known as Chamberfest, in Ottawa, Ontario, Canada. This year's edition will be held between July 25 and August 8, 2019.

Artists
In 1994, the idea of a chamber music festival in Ottawa came to life to remedy the meager availability of live classical music during the summer months and fill the city’s churches with splendid sounds. Ottawa Chamberfest started life as the Ottawa International Chamber Music Festival with 22 concerts in two churches and was an immediate hit. Artistic and executive director Julian Armor wanted to increase the popularity of classical music among citizens. Growing steadily over the years, the 2011 edition of Ottawa Chamberfest presented almost 100 concerts, attracting over 80,000 listeners and is the largest chamber music festival of its kind in the world.

Roman Borys, the cellist of the Juno award-winning Gryphon Trio is the Artistic and Executive Director of Ottawa Chamberfest. His fellow trio members, violinist Annalee Patipatanakoon and pianist James Parker, are among the organization's artistic advisors.

Among those who performed in the 2011 edition of the festival were Jan Lisiecki, Isabel Bayrakdarian, Simone Dinnerstein, Marc-André Hamelin, Julie Nesrallah, Yehonatan Berick, National Arts Centre Orchestra, The Swingle Singers, Nexus (ensemble), Trio con Brio Copenhagen, New Zealand String Quartet, TorQ Percussion Quartet and more.

Past performers include Paul Merkelo, Patrick Wedd, Guy Fouquet, Musica Camerata, Stéphane Lemelin, the Borodin String Quartet, the Beaux Arts Trio, the Tokyo String Quartet, Martin Beaver, Penderecki Quartet, Paul Stewart, Martin Chalifour, Monica Whicher,  Jennifer Swartz, and Gino Quilico, Quartango, Neil Gripp, Richard Raymond, the St. Lawrence Quartet, Mayumi Seiler, Keller Quartet, and Adaskin String Trio.

Music
Although the concerts are primarily traditional classical music, the scope has evolved to include music by pop and jazz composers and also music from non-European countries. The concerts of a typical day would have several different types of music. For Ottawa Chamberfest 2011, performances are divided into several Concert Series.
 Chamber Chat - Lecture series.
 Music at Noon - Music at lunch.
 New Music Now - Show casing new and emerging artists.
 Meet the Artist - Meet several performers up close and personal.
 Bring the Kids - Free shows for children. Interactive and fun.
 3PM Series - Afternoon shows
 The Siskind Concerts - Nightly shows dedicated to Jacob Siskind, music critic and arts patron.
 Market Soirées - Evening Shows with a focus on an intimate musical experience.
 Alfresco Concerts and Guerilla Gigs - Free outdoor concerts at Rideau Hall and other undisclosed locations.
 Late Night at the Kildare - Hosted by Saint Brigid's Church (Ottawa), a nightly series featuring a diverse set of performers.
 Festival Gala Series - 3 high profile performances at Dominion-Chalmers United Church.

Venues
The concert venues are generally churches or cultural facilities in the heart of downtown Ottawa. The confirmed venues for Ottawa Chamberfest 2011 are:
 Dominion-Chalmers United Church
 Rideau Hall
 Beechwood Cemetery
 Saint Brigid's Church (Ottawa)
 Anglican Church of St. John the Evangelist (Ottawa)

In previous years the University of Ottawa was also a regular venue. The Festival has also used, on occasion, Southam Hall in the National Arts Centre for special gala concerts.

Other activities
Apart from the annual summer festival, Ottawa Chamberfest also organizes activities throughout the year. The Concert Series takes place from fall to spring offering approximately ten concerts per season. CEE: Community Engagement and Education engages community members of all ages in a suite of free music experiences.

References
Citations

External links
 Ottawa Chamberfest official website
 Gryphon Trio

Music festivals established in 1994
Music festivals in Ottawa
Classical music festivals in Canada
Chamber music festivals